Epping Forest is a rural locality in the local government area (LGA) of Northern Midlands in the Central LGA region of Tasmania. The 2016 census recorded a population of 72 for the state suburb of Epping Forest.

History 
Epping Forest was gazetted as a locality in 1956. The area was named Epping by Governor Macquarie's party in 1811, presumably for Epping in England. It became known unofficially as Epping Forest and, when in 1956 a name change was required to avoid duplication, Epping Forest was chosen.

Geography
The South Esk River forms the northern boundary, and the Macquarie River forms part of the southern.

Road infrastructure 
National Route 1 (Midland Highway) passes through from south-east to north-west.

References

Towns in Tasmania
Localities of Northern Midlands Council